The Leesburg Historic District in Leesburg, Virginia is a historic district that includes Classical Revival, Greek Revival, and Georgian architecture and dates back to 1757.  It was listed on the National Register of Historic Places in 1970 and its boundaries were increased in 2002.

Additional Properties

Carlheim
In 2004, the Victorian era Second Empire - Italianate influenced Carlheim Mansion and  grounds (aka "Paxton") were added as a non-contiguous part of the Leesburg Historic District.  The property is held in private trust and became the home of the Margaret Paxton Memorial Learning and Resource Campus, which includes the Aurora School, in November 2009.

See also
Thomas Balch Library

References

External links
 1-5 North King Street (Drug Store), Leesburg, Loudoun County, VA at the Historic American Buildings Survey (HABS)
 Nichols Law Office, 13 South King Street, Leesburg, Loudoun County, VA at HABS
 Old Bank, 1 North Church Street, Leesburg, Loudoun County, VA at HABS

Historic districts in Loudoun County, Virginia
National Register of Historic Places in Loudoun County, Virginia
Neoclassical architecture in Virginia
Georgian architecture in Virginia
Greek Revival architecture in Virginia
Historic American Buildings Survey in Virginia
Historic districts on the National Register of Historic Places in Virginia
Leesburg, Virginia